Court Street (est. July 4, 1788) is located in the Financial District of Boston, Massachusetts. Prior to 1788, it was called Prison Lane (1634–1708) and then Queen Street (1708–1788). In the 19th century it extended beyond its current length, to Bowdoin Square. In the 1960s most of Court Street was demolished to make way for the construction of Government Center. The remaining street extends a few blocks, near the Old State House on State Street.

Tenants of Court Street

 Ames Building
Former tenants
 American Magazine of Useful and Entertaining Knowledge
 Annin & Smith, 19th-century engravers
 Boston Daily Advertiser
 Boston Gaol (Massachusetts), 1635–1822
 Concert Hall (Boston, Massachusetts)
 S.H. Gregory & Co., wallpaper, 1840s–1870s
 Elias Howe Company
 Independent Chronicle
 Charles H. Keith, music & umbrellas, 1840s–1850s
 Munroe & Francis, publishers
 The New-England Courant
 Palace Theatre
 S.S. Pierce, grocer, 19th century
 Henry Prentiss, music & umbrellas, 1830s–1850s
 New-England Museum (Boston)
 N.S. Simpkins' bookshop, 1820s
 William Tudor
 Young's Hotel (Boston)

References

Images

Further reading
 . ("Reprinted with additions from Notes and Queries of the Boston Transcript of Oct. 25, 1902")

External links

 Bostonian Society. Photos:
 Franklin celebration, Court Street, 1856
 Intersection of Court and Tremont Streets, c. 1860
 79-81 Court Street, c. 1870
 89-81 Court Street, c. 1870
 Court Street at Scollay Square, c. 1870
 Corner of Court Street and Cornhill, c. 1875
 Cobb's Boston Tea Company at 71 and 73 Court Street, c. 1890
 Court Square and Court Street, January 9, 1919
 Crawford House at 17 Court Street in Scollay Square, c. 1925
 Court and Tremont Streets, Scollay Square, August 12, 1934
 Court Street and Scollay Square, c. 1955
 Cornhill and Court Street, c. 1955-65
 Intersection of Court, Cambridge and Tremont Streets, 1967
 Pilgrim Lounge at Court Street, c. 1968
 Flickr. 2005
 Flickr. 2005.
 Flickr. 2006.
 Flickr. 2006
 Flickr. Ames Building, 2007
 Flickr. 26 Court St., 2008
 Flickr. Corner of Tremont and Court, 2009
 Flickr. Corner of Tremont and Court, 2009

Streets in Boston
Former buildings and structures in Boston
1788 establishments in Massachusetts
History of Boston
Financial District, Boston